The Hero Karizma ZMR is a motorcycle manufactured by Hero MotoCorp in India. It was launched as a cosmetic upgrade to Karizma R in September 2009. There is no difference between its engine and that of its predecessor Karizma R. The minor differences lie in the design of fairing, headlights, addition of digital speedometer, rear disc brake, rear swingarm suspension, oil cooler and the fuel-injection system instead of the carburettor.

The latest updated model was launched in 2014 which had an upgraded engine had and a totally new design.

References

External links 
Official website

Motorcycles introduced in 2009